Johannes Vermeer (1632–1675) was a Dutch Baroque Period painter.

Vermeer may also refer to:

People with the surname
 Al Vermeer (1911–1980), American cartoonist
 Anne Vermeer (1916–2018), Dutch Labour Party politician and centenarian
 Arie Vermeer (1922–2013), Dutch football defender
 Hans Vermeer (1930–2010), German linguist and translation scholar
 Jan Vermeer van Haarlem the Elder (1628–1691), Dutch landscape painter
 Jan Vermeer van Haarlem (II) (1656–1705), Dutch landscape painter and son of the former
 Jan Vermeer van Utrecht (1628–1691), Dutch painter who travelled to Italy
 Kenneth Vermeer (born 1986), Dutch football goalkeeper
 Natasja Vermeer (born 1973), Dutch model and actress
 Sanne Vermeer (born 1998), Dutch judoka
 Vinnie Vermeer (born 1995), Dutch football midfielder

Other uses

 4928 Vermeer, a main belt asteroid
 AMD Vermeer, the codename for the desktop line of AMD's Zen 3 CPUs
 Restaurant Vermeer, a restaurant in the Netherlands
 Vermeer Centre,  an information center dedicated to the painter Johannes Vermeer
 Vermeer Company, manufacturer of agricultural machines founded by Gary Vermeer
 Vermeer Dutch Chocolate Cream Liqueur
 Vermeer Quartet, a string quartet
 Vermeer Technologies, software company from 1994 to 1996 
 Vermeer's Window, a 1978 science fiction story by Gordon Eklund
 Vermeer (video game series), a series of strategy and business simulation video games

See also 
 

Dutch-language surnames
Dutch toponymic surnames